Miramonopis is a genus of moths belonging to the family Tineidae.

There is presently only one species in this genus: Miramonopis viettei Gozmány, 1966 that is known from the Central African Republic.

References

Endemic fauna of the Central African Republic
Tineidae
Monotypic moth genera
Tineidae genera